Riding High is a 1937 British comedy film directed by David MacDonald and starring Claude Dampier, John Garrick, Kathleen Gibson and Helen Haye. It is very loosely based on the story of the inventor Thomas McCall, who came up with a radically new design for a bicycle in Victorian Britain.

It was made at Shepperton Studios.

Cast
 Claude Dampier as Septimus Earwicker  
 Helen Haye as Miss Ada Broadbent  
 John Garrick as Tom Blake  
 Kathleen Gibson as Grace Meadows  
 John Warwick as George Davenport  
 Billy Merson as Popping  
 Mae Bacon as Mrs. Winterbottom
 Peter Gawthorne as Sir Joseph Wilmot  
 Billy Holland  as Jack Adamson  
 Billy Bray  as Ted Rance  
 Aileen Latham  as Fanny 
 The Georgian Singers  as Minstrel singers  
 Mansell & Ling as Banjo duet  
 Bertie Kendrick as Boy vocalist 
 Mike Johnson as Mayor  
 John Singer as Simon  
 H Victor Weske

References

External links

1937 films
1930s historical comedy films
British historical comedy films
Films set in the 19th century
Films set in England
Films directed by David MacDonald (director)
British black-and-white films
1937 comedy films
1930s English-language films
1930s British films